In geometry, this name may refer to:
 Truncated icosidodecahedron - An Archimedean solid, with Schläfli symbol t0,1,2{5,3}.
 Nonconvex great rhombicosidodecahedron - a nonconvex uniform polyhedron, with Schläfli symbol t0,2{5/3,3}.